Sir Kennedy Alphonse Simmonds, KCMG (born 12 April 1936), is a Saint Kittitian and Nevisian politician who served as the first prime minister of Saint Kitts and Nevis from 1983 to 1995.

Life and career

Simmonds was born in Basseterre on 12 April 1936. He graduated as a physician from the University of the West Indies in 1962.  He married Mary Matthew, and they had five children.

Simmonds was a founding member of  the People's Action Movement (PAM) party. He was the Premier of Saint Kitts and Nevis from 21 February 1980, until the twin-island state gained independence from the United Kingdom on 19 September 1983. Upon independence, he became the 1st Prime Minister of Saint Kitts and Nevis and as such has been hailed as "The Father of the Nation." 

Simmonds and his party ruled with the support of Nevis Reformation Party. He had three deputy prime ministers: Michael Oliver Powell 1980-1992, Sydney Earl Morris 1992-1994 and Hugh Heyliger 1994-1995.

Honours 

In 2004, Simmonds was made a Knight Commander of the Order of St Michael and St George. In 2015, Simmonds became the fifth person to be named as a National Hero by the National Assembly. He is the first living person to receive this honour.  In 2021, Simmonds received an honorary DSc from the University of the West Indies.

Simmonds published an autobiography in 2019 entitled The Making of a National Hero.

References

External links 

 An interview with Dr Kennedy Simmonds, Prime Minister of St Kitts and Nevis (1993) 

1936 births
Living people
Knights Commander of the Order of St Michael and St George
Prime Ministers of Saint Kitts and Nevis
Finance ministers of Saint Kitts and Nevis
Recipients of the Order of the National Hero (Saint Kitts and Nevis)
People's Action Movement politicians
People from Saint Kitts
Members of the Privy Council of the United Kingdom
National Heroes of Saint Kitts and Nevis
Foreign Ministers of Saint Kitts and Nevis
University of the West Indies alumni